Jürgen Fatmir Gjasula (born 5 December 1985) is an Albanian professional footballer who plays as an attacking midfielder for Berliner AK 07. He also holds German citizenship.

Club career

SC Freiburg
Born in Tirana, Albania, Gjasula started his career in the town where he grew up at SC Freiburg in Germany in 2002. At the age of 17 he was put into the first team but did not make any appearances.

1. FC Kaiserslautern
Gjasula signed for 1. FC Kaiserslautern in 2004 and made it a total of seven appearances in one season.

St. Gallen (loan)
In 2005, Gjasula was loaned in club FC St. Gallen on Swiss Super League. At first season with St Gallen, he became a box-to-box goalscoring threat and typical number 10 so he signed a contract in 2006.

FC Basel
On 2 June 2008, it was announced that Gjasula, as a free agent, had signed for Swiss Champions FC Basel. He joined Basel's first team for their 2008–09 season under head coach Christian Gross. Playing in his fifth pre-season game, Gjasula scored his first goal for Basel on 10 July 2008 in the Uhren Cup. It was the first goal of the game as Basel won 6–1 against Legia Warsaw. He scored his next goal in the next Uhren Cup match on 12 July, as Basel played a 2–2 draw with Borussia Dortmund to win the Uhren Cup that year. Gjasula played his domestic league debut for the club in the away game in the Stade de Suisse, Wankdorf on 18 July as Basel won 2–1 against Young Boys.

Basel joined the 2008–09 UEFA Europa League in the second qualifying round. Gjasula played his first European game in a Basel shirt on 30 July 2008 in a 1–1 Champions League Qualifying match draw against IFK Göteborg at Ullevi. Gjasula took a corner-kick in the 26th minute and Benjamin Huggel headed home, for the guests to take the lead, but the Swedish team equalised just six minutes later. With an aggregate score of 5–3 they eliminated Göteborg. In the next round they played against Vitória de Guimarães. The first leg ended in a goalless draw, but with a 2–1 win in the second leg they eliminated Vitória and advanced to the group stage. Here Basel were matched with Barcelona, Sporting CP and Shakhtar Donetsk, but ended the group in last position winning just one point after a 1–1 draw in Camp Nou.

In the 2008–09 Swiss Cup Basel advanced via Schötz 1–0, Bulle 4–1 (one goal Gjasula), Thun 4–0 (one goal Gjasula) and Zurich 1–0 to the semi-finals. But here they were stopped by Young Boys. After a goalless 90 minutes and extra time YB decided the match in the penalty shoot-out 3–2. Here Gjasula was one of three Basel players who didn't hit the target with their spot-kicks. YB advanced to the final to become runners-up, as Sion became cup winners. At the end of the 2008–09 Super League season Basel were third in the table, seven points behind new champions Zürich and one adrift of runners-up Young Boys. However, as the season progressed, Gjasula became less and less playing time. On 18 June 2009, his contract was terminated by the club, after the newly appointed manager Thorsten Fink decided to plan without him. During his time with the club, Gjasula played a total of 43 games for Basel scoring a total of nine goals. 19 of these games were in the Swiss Super League, five in the Swiss Cup, four in the Champions League and 15 were friendly games. He scored two goals in the domestic league, two in the cup and the other five were scored during the test games. Gjasula stayed by the club, with individual training, to keep fit, until he found a new club. At the end of August it was announced that he had found a new employer.

FSV Frankfurt
Gjasula signed on 31 August 2009 for FSV Frankfurt where he made it a total of 60 appearances and scored nine goals in two seasons with club.

MSV Duisburg
In July 2011, he signed for MSV Duisburg.

Litex Lovech
On 5 July 2013, Gjasula signed with Bulgarian club Litex Lovech, rejoining his compatriot and fellow Albanian international player Armando Vajushi. He quickly established himself as a crucial player in the squad, providing several goals for the surprisingly magnificent start of the club.

Gjasula scored the third goal from the penalty spot in the 2–4 away victory on 20 October 2013 against Ludogorets Razgrad. A week later, on 27 October, he scored the second goal in the 90th minute of a 0–2 victory over Neftochimic Burgas.

Litex finished first stage of the 2013–14 season as runners-up. They played the last match on 9 March 2014 against winners of the league Ludogorets Razgrad trailing by one point and drew the match 0–0. For the regular season Gjasula made 26 appearances including 3 in the Bulgarian Cup, scoring 11 goals of which 9 came in the league. He finished in 8th place on the league's top scorers table, while making 8 assists positioning in fourth place on league's table of top assists.

Gjasula finished the 2013–14 season scoring in total 11 goals (including 2 in the Bulgarian Cup) in 35 appearances and Litex ranked 3rd in the league table, gaining entry to play in the UEFA Europa League for the next season.

With coming of the new coach Miodrag Ješić, Gjasula was not anymore in the club plans as they announced that would not renew his one-year contract. On 4 June 2014, Turkish side Bursaspor announced that they were looking for an attacking midfielder and that Gjasula was an option.

VfR Aalen
On 10 September 2014, Gjasula signed with 2. Bundesliga side VfR Aalen a contract until June 2015.

Greuther Fürth
On 7 June 2015, it was announced, that Gjasula had signed a contract with Greuther Fürth.

Viktoria Berlin
On 30 September 2018, Gjasula signed with Viktoria Berlin and got shirt number 18.

Energie Cottbus
On 31 January 2019, Gjasula joined Energie Cottbus on a short-term deal.

1. FC Magdeburg
Gjasula left Energie Cottbus at the end of the 2018–19 season and instead joined 1. FC Magdeburg for the 2019–20 season on a one-year contract.

Berliner AK 07
He joined Berliner AK 07 of the Regionalliga Nordost in September 2021.

International career
Gjasula decided to play for Albania national football team in May 2013. He received an Albanian passport on 24 May 2013 among other compatriots, Amir Abrashi, Vullnet Basha, Azdren Llullaku and Ilir Berisha and so he was able to play on international games. He received his first call-up by coach Gianni De Biasi for 2 matches against Norway on 22 March 2013, valid for the 2014 FIFA World Cup qualification and the friendly against Lithuania on 26 March 2013. He made his debut on 14 August in a friendly-match against Armenia by coming as a substitute in place of Odise Roshi in the 56th minute.

Personal life
Gjasula was born in the capital of Albania, Tirana and raised in Freiburg, Germany. His younger brother Klaus Gjasula is a footballer who plays as a defensive midfielder.

Career statistics

Club

International

Honours
Basel
 Uhrencup: 2008

References

External links

 Jürgen Gjasula at Swiss Football League Website 
 

1985 births
Living people
Footballers from Tirana
Albanian footballers
Sportspeople from Freiburg im Breisgau
Footballers from Baden-Württemberg
Albanian emigrants to Germany
German people of Albanian descent
Association football midfielders
Albania international footballers
German footballers
SC Freiburg players
1. FC Kaiserslautern players
FC St. Gallen players
FC Basel players
FSV Frankfurt players
MSV Duisburg players
PFC Litex Lovech players
VfR Aalen players
SpVgg Greuther Fürth players
FC Energie Cottbus players
1. FC Magdeburg players
FC Viktoria 1889 Berlin players
Berliner AK 07 players
Bundesliga players
2. Bundesliga players
Swiss Super League players
First Professional Football League (Bulgaria) players
3. Liga players
Regionalliga players
Albanian expatriate footballers
Expatriate footballers in Switzerland
Albanian expatriate sportspeople in Switzerland
Expatriate footballers in Bulgaria
Albanian expatriate sportspeople in Bulgaria